Operation Hyacinth is a 2021 Polish film directed by Piotr Domalewski, written by Marcin Ciaston and starring Tomasz Ziętek, Hubert Miłkowski and Marek Kalita. The drama is based on the Operation Hyacinth (Polish: Akcja "Hiacynt"), which was a secret mass operation of the Polish communist police, carried out in the years 1985–87. Its purpose was to create a national database of all Polish homosexuals and people who were in touch with them. The film was well received by critics.

Synopsis 
Robert is in his mid-twenties and new to the police force. His father Edward holds a senior position and is keen for his son to follow in his footsteps. Robert's colleague Wojtek has been working for the Citizens' Militia (MO) for some time. They investigate a case in which a serial murderer has been targeting homosexuals in Warsaw. For the investigation, Robert infiltrates the local gay scene through German-language student Arek. Ultimately he discovers his own homosexual desires, beginning a relationship with the young man despite being engaged to marry Halinka, who works at the agency in the evidence department.

Production

Direction and screenplay 
Director Piotr Domalewski was born in 1983 and grew up in Łomża. After completing his secondary education, he enrolled at the Aleksander-Zelwerowicz Academy for Drama in Białystok and began his study of puppet shows. After his exams, he continued his education until 2009 at the Faculty for Drama at the National Academy for Theatre Arts in Kraków. As an actor, he appeared in the Wybrzeże Theatre and worked with directors such as Anna Augustynowicz, Grzegorz Wiśniewski and Ewelina Marciniak. At this time he shot the short film Stranger, an adaptation of Robert Musil's The Man Without Qualities. His feature film debut Silent Night (Cicha noc) received multiple awards including best film at the Gdynia Film Festival. Domalewski's second feature film I Never Cry (Jak najdalej stad) premiered in September 2020.

Marcin Ciastoń drew inspiration for the screenplay from Operation Hyacinth, an action undertaken by the Polish secret services in the 1980s. The operation targeted the country's gay community, and the material gathered was used to extort men and to enforce their cooperation. Launched under the pretext of tackling the AIDS epidemic and prostitution, Operation Hyacinth saw a significant number of gays imprisoned, arrested or otherwise persecuted.

Cast 
 Tomasz Ziętek as Robert Mrozowski
 Hubert Miłkowski as Arek
 Marek Kalita as Edward Mrozowski
 Adrianna Chlebicka as Halinka
 Tomasz Schuchardt as Wojtek
 Sebastian Stankiewicz as Maciek
 Jacek Poniedziałek as Dignitary
 Piotr Trojan as Kamil
 Agnieszka Suchora as Ewa Mrozowska
 Tomasz Włosok as Tadek
 Mirosław Zbrojewicz as Commander
 Andrzej Klak as Agent with a scar
 Adam Cywka as Professor Mettler
 Jakub Wieczorek as Sleuth

See also
Cinema of Poland
List of LGBT-related films

References

External links 
 
 

2021 films
Polish-language films
Polish-language Netflix original films
Polish LGBT-related films
Polish drama films
Films set in the 1980s
Gay-related films